Alan Costello is a Gaelic footballer from County Mayo. He has played for the Mayo county team and, currently, for the Sligo county team. He was part of the Mayo team that made it to the 2004 All-Ireland Final but lost out to Kerry. He joined up with the Sligo county team after moving to the county. Since then he has won consecutive National League titles: Div 4 in 2009 and Div 3 in 2010. Receiving a GPA All Star nomination in 2010. He also played for the IT Sligo college team and won Sigerson Cup medals with it in 2004 and 2005. In 2022 Alan was announced as the new Wicklow Gaa senior football manager.

References
 Costello all set to face native county - HoganStand
 Champions stroll through - HoganStand

Year of birth missing (living people)
Living people
Coolera-Strandhill Gaelic footballers
Mayo inter-county Gaelic footballers
Sligo inter-county Gaelic footballers